During the 2009–10 season, the British ice hockey club Slough Jets was placed second in the English Premier Ice Hockey League (EPIHL), and won the championship in the playoff stage. The team reached the final round of the EPIHL Premier Cup.

League

League standings

Playoffs

Aggregate Scores for Quarter Finals

Slough Jets Playoff CHAMPIONS!!

Premier Cup

Premier Cup Finals
Aggregate Scores

 Guildford Flames are the 2009-2010 English Premier Cup Champions.

Player stats

Skaters
Note: GP = Games played; G = Goals; A = Assists; Pts = Points; +/− = Plus/minus; PIM = Penalty minutes

Goaltenders
Note: GP = Games played; TOI = Time on ice (minutes); W = Wins; L = Losses; OT = Overtime losses; GA = Goals against; SO = Shutouts; Sv% = Save percentage; GAA = Goals against average

Roster

Slou
Slough Jets seasons